Google Talkback is an accessibility service for the Android operating system that helps blind and visually impaired users to interact with their devices. It uses spoken words, vibration and other audible feedback to allow the user to know what is happening on the screen allowing the user to better interact with their device. The service is pre-installed on many Android devices, and it became part of the Android Accessibility Suite in 2017. According to the Google Play Store, the Android Accessibility Suite has been downloaded over five billion times, including devices that have the suite preinstalled.

Open-source 
Google releases the source code of Google TalkBack with some releases of the accessibility service to GitHub, with the latest of these changes being from May 6th, 2021. The source for these versions of Google TalkBack have been released under the Apache License version 2.0.

Release History

References

External links
Google Play application page
Help page

TalkBack
Android (operating system) software